Julian Kirzner (born 24 October 1976) is a former Australian rules footballer for the Essendon Football Club and North Melbourne Football Club in the Australian Football League (AFL). He played one match for the Essendon Football Club, and three matches for Kangaroos Football Club.  He scored six goals in four AFL matches at full-forward.

References

External links

1976 births
Australian rules footballers from Victoria (Australia)
North Melbourne Football Club players
Essendon Football Club players
Living people